James Ferrier is a former association football player who represented New Zealand at international level.

Ferrier Made two appearances in official A-internationals for New Zealand, the first in a 3–5 loss to Australia on 5 November 1967, followed by a substitute appearance in an 8–2 win over Malaysia on 16 November 1967, Ferrier scoring one of New Zealand's goals.

References 

New Zealand association footballers
New Zealand international footballers
Scottish emigrants to New Zealand
20th-century births
Year of birth missing
Possibly living people
Association footballers not categorized by position